The Heartbroken is a Canadian indie rock band based in Toronto, Ontario.  The band consists of Damhnait Doyle, Blake Manning, Stuart Cameron and Peter Fusco.

History
The Heartbroken came together in  2009, and made their debut in March that year at the East Coast Music Awards.  The band members had played together previously in Doyle's band Shaye.

The band released an album, Tonight Tonight, in 2011, with guest musicians Stew Crookes and fiddler James McKie. The album was nominated for a Canadian Country Music Award.  That year the band went on a Canadian tour.

A second album, Storm Clouds, was released in 2016.

Discography

Studio albums

Singles

Awards and nominations

References 
Citations

External links
The Heartbroken official website
theheartbrokenmusic YouTube

Musical groups established in 2009
Musical groups from Toronto
Canadian pop music groups
2009 establishments in Ontario